Muratlı is a settlement in the Dinar District, Afyonkarahisar Province, Turkey. At  it is the highest settlement in the district.

References

Dinar District